William Stanton Jones (29 July 1866 – 13 August 1951) was an Anglican bishop.

Stanton Jones was educated at Durham University. Ordained in 1892 he began his ordained ministry as a curate at Widnes, after which he was vicar of St Polycarp's Liverpool. He was then vicar of St Mary's with St Lawrence's Kirkdale, Liverpool and rural dean of Middleton. From 1921 (pictured) to 1928 he was Archdeacon of Bradford when he was ordained to the episcopate as Bishop of Sodor and Man, a position he held for 14 years.

References

1866 births
1951 deaths
20th-century Church of England bishops
Archdeacons of Bradford
Bishops of Sodor and Man
Deans of Peel
People from Birkenhead
Place of birth missing
Place of death missing
Alumni of St Cuthbert's Society, Durham